Peculiar Penguins is a Silly Symphonies animated Disney short film. It was released in 1934.

Plot
On an island near Antarctica, a male penguin named Peter sees a female named Polly, and attempts to woo her. First he offers her an ice cream made of snow and icicle, which she accepts. Next, he tries catching her a fish, but only succeeds in catching a pufferfish. Polly accepts it graciously, but when she swallows it, she begins inflating and deflating repeatedly until Peter makes her spit out the fish, which then returns to water.

Peter shrugs in embarrassment, but feeling humiliated, Polly slaps him and leaves to swim on a small iceberg. On the shore, Peter kicks a nearby stick for letting her get away, but then notices a sharkfin moving towards Polly's iceberg. He squawks a danger warning to her, but Polly ignores him, thinking that he's just begging for forgiveness that he won't get. Soon enough, the shark attacks Polly, who swims away in panic. Needing to act, Peter picks up the stick and charges out to help.

The shark chases Polly around the bay for a while. When it looks like he has her cornered, Peter arrives and clobbers him on the nose. Enraged, the shark starts chasing after Peter. After a while of fighting and swimming away from the shark, Peter tries to escape by climbing up onto a cliff with a boulder on top. Peter unintentionally dislodges the boulder, which falls into the shark's mouth, who then swallows it. Due to the boulder's weight, the shark sinks to the bottom of the bay. The shark struggles until he's too tired to move. Passing fish begin to poke fun at him.

Meanwhile, Polly and Peter reconcile and fall in love, thus Peter's wooing succeeded. They cuddle, and their bodies form a heart-shaped silhouette on the horizon.

Comic adaptation
The Silly Symphony Sunday comic strip ran a three-month-long adaptation of Peculiar Penguins called "Penguin Isle" from July 1 to September 19, 1934.

Home media
The short was released on December 4, 2001, on Walt Disney Treasures: Silly Symphonies - The Historic Musical Animated Classics.

References

External links
 

1934 films
1934 short films
1930s Disney animated short films
Films directed by Wilfred Jackson
Films produced by Walt Disney
Films scored by Leigh Harline
Silly Symphonies
1934 animated films
Animated films about penguins
Animated films without speech
1930s American films